The Tottenham Bluegrass Festival is an annual event which has been held in the community of Tottenham, Ontario since 1983.

The Tottenham Bluegrass Festival presents a three-day stage show featuring well-known bluegrass bands from around Canada and the United States.

In addition to the main stage entertainment, the festival also includes a children's talent show, instrument-specific workshops, new band showcases, an artisan's village, a barbeque supper, and campfire picking.

Contributing to the 30-year success of this festival is its location, the Tottenham Conservation Area, with shady camping for hundreds of trailers and tents and a natural amphitheatre overlooking a small lake.

Gallery

See also

List of bluegrass music festivals
List of country music festivals

References

External links
Official website

Folk festivals in Canada
1983 establishments in Ontario
Bluegrass festivals
Music festivals in Ontario
Music festivals established in 1983